Olavakkode is a region  in Palakkad city, Kerala, India. It is composed of two main areas: the Kavilpad and the Railway Colony. Olavakkode is located 4 km from Palakkad city and lies on National Highway 966.It is one of the major suburbs of Palakkad city as Palakkad Junction railway station one of the major stations of the city is located there.

Transport
The main railway station in the city, Palakkad Junction railway station is situated there. It is also the entry point by road from the North Malabar. Olavakkode lies on National Highway 966, which connects Palakkad with Kozhikode via Malappuram. The nearest airport is Coimbatore International Airport.

Economy
During the 2010s many residential developments were built in this area. National Highway 966 connects Palakkad with Kozhikode. Facilities like banks ( including Sunday banking by one of the premier banks), ATMs, shopping places, lodges, hotels, hospitals, dental outlets, and marriage halls are available.

Points of interest
 Palakkad Junction (formerly called Olavakkode Junction)
 Palakkad railway division office 
 Divisional Railway Hospital
 Malampuzha Dam and Garden
 Shri Thirupuraikkal Bhagavathy temple
 Thirumananghat Shiva Temple
 Jain Temple
 Previous location of the Broad Gauge Railway junction
St.Joseph's Forane Church

Image Gallery

References

 
Suburbs of Palakkad
Cities and towns in Palakkad district